Turan University (Tūran Universitetı; Russian: Университет Туран) is one of the first and largest non-state universities in Almaty, Kazakhstan. It was established in 1992. Turan University  is a full-cycle educational institution: lyceum – college – bachelor – master – doctorate Ph.D. - dissertation council.

Turan University’s educational system includes three faculties: Humanities and Law, Economics, Academy of Film and Television. The university employs 361 full-time teachers, including 55 doctors of science, professors, 215 candidates of science and associate professors, 1 doctor Ph.D. In addition to them, the educational process provides more than 49 practitioners, scientists, and teachers.

Campus 
The university has its own campus with a total area of 35 000 m². The main building is 7 stories tall and hosts the administration and the Economics, Humanities and Law faculties. The campus includes three football pitches, three sports halls, and a dormitory.

Academics 
Educational Corporation "Turan" is a holistic system that provides the principle of continuity and multi-stage education, and includes:

 2 universities (Almaty and Nur-Sultan)
 3 Colleges (Almaty and Nur-Sultan)
 Lyceum (Almaty)
 Educational and recreational complex "Tau-Turan"

References

External links 
 

1992 establishments in Kazakhstan
Private universities and colleges in Asia
Universities in Kazakhstan
Educational institutions established in 1992
Education in Almaty